Helen is an album released by Helen Humes in 1981 on Muse MR 5233, her second for that company.  The album was in the final nominations for the 24th Annual Grammy Awards in the category of “Best Jazz Vocal Performance.”

Personnel
 Helen Humes – vocals
 Joe Wilder – trumpet
 Buddy Tate – tenor sax
 Norman Simmons – piano
 Billy Butler – guitar
 George Duvivier – bass
 Butch Miles – drums

Track listing 
 "There'll Be Some Changes Made" (B. Overstreet – B. Higgins) – 4:55
 "Easy Living" (Ralph Rainger – Leo Robin) – 4:16
 "You Brought a New Kind of Love to Me" (Sammy Fain – Irving Kahal – Pierre Norman) – 7:45
 "Evil Gal Blues" (Leonard Feather) – 6:48
 "Why Try to Change Me Now?" (C. Coleman – J. A. McCarthy) – 4:04
 "Draggin’ My Heart Around" (A. Hill) – 6:45

References

1981 albums
Muse Records albums